Julie Restifo, (born July 31, 1958) is an American-born Venezuelan actress. She is best known for his characters in the telenovelas La loba herida, La llaman Mariamor, Hay amores que matan, Viva la Pepa,  and La mujer de Judas.

Biography 
Restifo was born in Long Island, United States on 31 July 1958. She studied social communication at Universidad Católica Andrés Bello. She is married to actor Javier Vidal, with whom she has two children, Jan and Josette Vidal.

Filmography

Films

Television

References

External links 

1958 births
Living people
21st-century Venezuelan actresses
American emigrants to Venezuela
Venezuelan telenovela actresses
Venezuelan film actresses
20th-century Venezuelan actresses
RCTV personalities